Will Kimmel III (born May 11, 1988) is an American stock car racing driver. He is the son of Bill Kimmel, Jr. and nephew of Frank Kimmel. He currently competes part-time in the ARCA Menards Series for family-owned Kimmel Racing. He formerly competed in the NASCAR Cup Series for Go Fas Racing.

Career

Kimmel began his racing career in 1998; in 2006 he began competing at Salem Speedway, winning the track's Rookie of the Year award for Super Late Model drivers. The following year he won the track's championship, becoming the youngest driver to do so. He made his debut in the ARCA Racing Series in 2008, competing in 62 races in the series between 2008 and 2013 with a best finish of second at Salem in 2011. Kimmel also won the Polar Bear 150 street-stock race at Rockingham Speedway in 2010, beating Kurt Busch.

NASCAR
In 2010, Kimmel made his debut in NASCAR competition, driving the No. 44 Ford in a Camping World Truck Series event at Kentucky Speedway, finishing 21st. He made his first start in the Nationwide Series the following year at Kentucky Speedway, driving for Go Green Racing; he finished 35th after an accident.

In January 2014, Kimmel announced that he would be driving for TriStar Motorsports part-time in the Nationwide Series during the 2014 season, competing in five events driving the No. 44 Toyota.

On May 12, 2015, Kimmel joined Go FAS Racing for his Sprint Cup Series debut, which took place in the Quaker State 400 at Kentucky. Kimmel finished in 38th, five laps behind the leaders. He then raced at Kansas for the Hollywood Casino 400, and finished 39th.

Motorsports career results

NASCAR
(key) (Bold – Pole position awarded by qualifying time. Italics – Pole position earned by points standings or practice time. * – Most laps led.)

Sprint Cup Series

Nationwide Series

Camping World Truck Series

 Season still in progress
 Ineligible for series points

ARCA Menards Series
(key) (Bold – Pole position awarded by qualifying time. Italics – Pole position earned by points standings or practice time. * – Most laps led.)

References

External links
 
 

Living people
1988 births
People from Sellersburg, Indiana
Racing drivers from Indiana
NASCAR drivers
ARCA Menards Series drivers